Arthur Kalala Katalayi (born May 10, 1982), nicknamed "The Katalyst", is a French businessman, podcaster, consultant  and entrepreneur  based in the Democratic Republic of Congo. A former senior advisor to the chairman of the board of directors at state-owned copper and cobalt mining company Gecamines, he is a senior partner at boutique management consulting firm A2k Advisory and host for the mining-focused podcast The Right Advice.

Early life and education 
A Luba art collector of Luba ancestry, Katalayi was born near the French Alps at the Edouard Herriot Hospital in the city of Lyon, France. He was raised in Paris. His namesakes are American tennis player Arthur Ashe and Kingdom of Luba emperor Kalala Ilunga. Katalayi first visited the Democratic Republic of Congo aged 6; in Kinshasa, and Lubumbashi, in the Katanga Province.
At the age of 16, he left France for the United Kingdom where he spent a year in London, before attending the City of Stoke-on-Trent Sixth Form College from 1999 until 2001.

Katalayi moved to the United States in July 2001 arriving in New York City. He then settled in Pittsburgh before moving to Salem International University earning a Bachelor of Science in Computer Science and Information Technology in 2005. At Salem, he played college soccer as a student-athlete on an athletic scholarship; winning the West Virginia Intercollegiate Athletic Conference  cup. He subsequently moved to New Jersey and earned a Master of Arts in Oganizational Leadership and Information Technology from Rider University in 2009.

Career 
After graduating, Katalayi worked briefly as a market analyst for New York Stock Exchange in New York City, and as a finance analyst for Bloomberg LP in Princeton, New Jersey.  He then moved back to Europe  and was hired by Capgemini Engineering to work in the company's Paris office as a management consultant. In 2014, Katalayi joined state-owned mining firm Gecamines as a senior advisor to its chairman Albert Yuma. He  was also the latter’s economic advisor at the Federation of Businesses of the Congo, Congo’s largest  employer federation.
At the time it was understood that Gecamines  was assessing different modes of financing with the possibility to monetize some of its copper and cobalt assets via an initial public offering –  Gecamines  stakes in its joint-ventures thought to be valued in excess of $2 billion; which includes a $1 billion valuation in Glencore-controlled Kamoto Copper Company according to a Bank of America Merrill Lynch report.

The Democratic Republic of Congo, via Gecamines, holds 80% of the world's cobalt reserves, the price of which has soared more than 70% on the London Metal Exchange and is the hottest commodity within the global financial market as of 2017. Given the insatiable demand for cobalt, a key ingredient used in lithium-ion batteries powering everything from Apple Inc.,'s iPhone to Tesla, Inc. cars, the interest in the mineral that helps fuel the Chinese and Californian economies is only likely to increase and yield more future opportunities for Gecamines; especially considering that cobalt is essential for the battery technology needed for the shift to renewable energy. In a Financial Times interview, Gecamines chairman expressed his dissatisfaction with existing joint-ventures, having failed to generate excepted dividends, and that future partnerships with investors will differ from current ones.

Katalayi was a senior advisor and global ambassador for Giving Back to Africa for over 10 years.

Personal life
Katalayi met his wife Nathalie, a devoted pediatric nurse, in Brussels in 2001; they married in Liege in 2007. She is a school nurse at The American School of Kinshasa in Kinshasa. They have a daughter Akeelah, a ballerina, and a son, Akhenaten, a soccer player. Both of whom attend The American School of Kinshasa.

Awards and recognition 
2012, SAfm's Mover and Shaker - South African Broadcasting Corporation; Johannesburg.
2017, Global Top 100 Most Influential People of African Descent in the world - under 40; New York.

References 

Living people
Rider University alumni
Businesspeople from New York (state)
Businesspeople from New Jersey
Businesspeople from London
French expatriates in the United States
Salem International University alumni
People from Princeton, New Jersey
Businesspeople from Pittsburgh
French emigrants to the United States
French people of Democratic Republic of the Congo descent
American people of Democratic Republic of the Congo descent
People from Lubumbashi
Businesspeople from Indiana
People from Kinshasa
1982 births